Tabbat (also Romanized as Tabat) is a village in Torkaman Rural District, in the Central District of Urmia County, West Azerbaijan Province, Iran. At the 2006 census, its population was 531, in 155 families.

References 

Populated places in Urmia County